Green County High School is a public high school in Greensburg, Kentucky, United States.

References

External links
 

Schools in Green County, Kentucky
Public high schools in Kentucky
Greensburg, Kentucky